Holsbybrunn is a locality situated in Vetlanda Municipality, Jönköping County, Sweden with 729 inhabitants in 2010. Ädelfors folkhögskola is located in Holsbybrunn. An international English speaking Bible School affiliated with Torchbearers International is also located in the locality as well as YWAM Småland, which runs a Discipleship Training School every year.

References 

Populated places in Jönköping County
Populated places in Vetlanda Municipality